Gymnosophistis is a genus of moths in the family Sesiidae.

Species
Gymnosophistis thyrsodoxa Meyrick, 1934

References

Sesiidae